Maoritomella albula is a species of sea snail, a marine gastropod mollusk in the family Borsoniidae.

Description
The height of the shell attains 9 mm, its width 3.7 mm. The smooth spire is acute The 7½ whorls are spirally grooved with the grooves finely transversely striated. There is also a central prominent spiral rib. The aperture is oblong. The siphonal canal is very short. The body whorl is as long as the spire. The color of the shell is ochraceous white. The apex and the columella are white. The angle of the spire is 30°.

Distribution
This marine species occurs off Tasmania and New Zealand.

References

 Powell, A.W.B. 1979: New Zealand Mollusca: Marine, Land and Freshwater Shells, Collins, Auckland

External links
 
  Bouchet P., Kantor Yu.I., Sysoev A. & Puillandre N. (2011) A new operational classification of the Conoidea. Journal of Molluscan Studies 77: 273–308

albula
Gastropods described in 1873